, often abbreviated , and also known as They Are My Noble Masters, is a Japanese adult visual novel developed by Minato Soft and released on May 25, 2007 for Windows on DVD. A PlayStation 2 version with adult-content removed was released under the title Kimi ga Aruji de Shitsuji ga Ore de: Otsukae Nikki on March 27, 2008. Two separate novel versions have been written, the first by Haruka Fuse, and the second by Fūichirō Noyama. A manga version started serialization in Kadokawa Shoten's magazine Comp Ace on October 26, 2007 written by Hamao Kō, and illustrated by Sanbō Shironeko. An anime adaptation aired in Japan from January to March 2008 on TV Kanagawa. A set of three drama CDs have been produced, along with a radio drama CD.

Plot
Due to family troubles, Ren Uesugi and his sister, Mihato, leave their home. They end up moving to the city but find themselves with a lack of money. Somehow they are able to find work in the form of the Kuonji family's mansion, being employed as servants to the three sisters of the Kuonji family: Shinra, Miyu, and Yume. Being a servant also associates Ren with the mansion's additional servants and the Kuonji sisters' friends.

Characters

Ren was hired by the Kuonji family after running away from home with his older half-sister, Mihato. Known for his stubbornness and unwillingness to admit defeat, he also has a slight older sister complex towards Mihato. The siblings ran away when he could no longer tolerate the beatings their father gave him. Although he works all around the mansion, Ren's primary responsibility is serving as Shinra's personal butler because she loves to tease him for his honest and straightforward personality. As the story progresses, Ren develops feelings for Shinra Kuonji. Ren is called Ren-chan by his sister whom he calls Hato-nee.

 (credited in PC as Rina Misaki)
Eldest sister of the Kuonji siblings, she has a habit of teasing the people she likes and a fondness for cute things particularly Ren and her own sister, Miyu. Her favorite animal is a panda because she finds how they are black and white "cute". Despite her relatively young age she has made a name for herself as a famous orchestral conductor. On hiring Ren and Mihato, Shinra tells them not to refer to Miyu with honorifics.

 (credited in PC as Erena Kaibara)
Venis is the Kuonji head maid and Shinra's personal attendant. She has a violent short temper. Her name has a similar phonetic sound to "penis" when said in Japanese. This is shown to greatly aggravate her when the Uesugi siblings make fun of it. Venis grew up in a poor section of an unnamed European city, working at a relative's restaurant while learning to cook, learning to fight while protecting herself from those who would try to grab her, and teaching herself math in the streets. After the restaurant closed, she was picked up off the streets by the Colonel, who was impressed by her skill in cooking and brought her to work at the Kuonji house. She values Shinra's praise and attention above all else because she feels that Shinra gives her a reason to live. However when the two are kidnapped and Ren purposely aggravates their kidnappers to divert their attention from her, she begins to see him in a new light.

 (credited in PC as Shino Kujō)
Second oldest of the Kuonji and referred to as a "loli" by Shinra due to her short and childish appearance. Despite her size and figure, she is actually in her twenties. She constantly protests against being treated as child and molested by Shinra, but she gives in when the treatment has a small plus side to it (candy, presents, games, hugs, etc.) Miyu is a shotacon though she also seems attracted to Ren as well. She is also the smartest of the sisters, already having graduated from college. Miyu claims to have an I.Q. of 240 and earns millions by selling her patented inventions, thus she has a lot of free time to idle around. She created De Niro, an egg shaped robot. Miyu was the first of the Kuonji sisters whom Ren meets when Miyu passes out in the street.

 (credited in PC as Minami Hokuto)
Ren's older half sister who ran away with him. She occasionally needs glasses, is known to hide items in forty-nine different places on her body and has admitted to having a "Brother Complex". After she and Ren become part of the servant staff, she shows signs of being lonely without him near her, even though they are in the same building. She is sometimes jealous that Ren pays attention to girls other than her and thinks of ways of removing the person who is drawing his attention away from her, but is usually stopped before anything happens (played for comedic effect in the anime). She works as Miyu's personal maid. Ren calls Mihato Hato-nee and she refers to him as Ren-chan.

 (credited in PC as Sora Amano)
The youngest of the Kuonji siblings and probably the most stereotypically average one among them as far as personality and personal problems go. Referring to herself with her own name (a typically childish trait), Yume is usually overlooked by her sisters. Only Natose and Ren pay her any serious attention. She is envious of Shinra's fondness of Miyu. Her hobbies include repairing radio antennas, reading manga, writing silly imaginative stories and collecting seashells. Her most noticeable feature is her shockingly pink hair.

 (credited in PC as Misaki Kamishiro)
Natose is Yume's personal attendant and also the head of security for Kuonji mansion. She has blue hair and wears an eyepatch over her right eye. When in battle she takes a Muay Thai stance. She has a great love for food and is shown to have superhuman abilities when it comes to obtaining it. She grew up on an island together with a younger sister and brother, however she lost her family and her right eye in a tsunami. Ren astutely observes that she has always wished to have a younger sibling and thus calls her "big sis". Her name means "Southern Star" and she is depicted as almost dog-like (abundant energy, fetching the paper by leaping ridiculously high in the air, a love for meat products, a vicious fighter when her master is in need of her, incredibly loyal, but relatively easy to fool or distract, etc.)

 (credited in PC as Zenshu Iwao)
The head butler, who used to be in the special forces, and whose name is Taijiri Yasushi. He believes himself to be incredibly handsome. In the anime, he frequently parodies other anime series, most notoriously Mobile Fighter G Gundam, as part of an in-joke referring to the fact that his and Ren's voice actors played major roles in that series. While very hard on Ren by pushing him to the limit in his butler training, he is in reality an honorable man and believes in Ren. The colonel's entire body is covered in scars from the time he spent in the special forces however they are usually covered by his butler uniform.

 (credited as in PC as Ichibu Kachidoki)
Miyu's invention who serves as her attendant. An egg shaped robot with a mouth, not radio controlled but an advanced A.I that gives him free will and thoughts and also a bullying attitude. He likes to molest electronic appliances and sing karaoke, however his voice is designed as a powerful weapon which can cause serious brain damage to people. He also utilizes several other tools and weapons throughout the series including a drill and some form of a rocket system, however, it is unclear exactly with how many he has been equipped or of what they are capable.

 (credited in PC as Kū Iida)
Although he is male, Chiharu looks and sounds feminine. He is in charge of cleaning the Kuonji household. As a nod to his less important role in the story, he is often being overlooked and forgotten by everybody. He grows to have a crush on Venis (which Ren, Yume or Natose could not believe) because she constantly looks out for him, but desists when she tells him that she may be attracted to Ren. Despite knowing that Chiharu is male Ren is still uneasy about him and refuses to shower together with him.

A rich girl who is Yume's classmate. She has a butler of her own named Kojūrō whom she often hits regardless of whether he has completed or failed a task. She comes to have feelings for Ren after seeing his honest, hardworking personality and takes his first kiss (it was also her first kiss). The cross-shaped scar on her forehead is explained in the PlayStation 2 version (according to the Colonel). She enjoys kelp tea. In the anime, Ageha rewards people other than Kojūrō by giving them food. An older Ageha Kuki appears as a character in Maji de Watashi ni Koi Shinasai! alongside her brother.

 (credited in PC as Toraji Tatsuta)
Kojūrō is Ageha's butler. He does not mind being hit by her; in fact, he finds great displeasure in receiving any other form of punishment (or praise). While strong and hardworking, he tends to be a blockhead.

 (credited in PC as Arika Kusugami)
Keiko is another classmate of Yume's and is nicknamed "Kei".

 (credited in PC as Shingyo Mezume)
Yet another one of Yume's classmates and nicknamed "Mi". Anastasia has an extreme affection for pain.

 (credited in PC as Akira Kota)
Isao is Ren and Mihato's father, who was abusive towards Ren during his childhood. It was revealed that Ren's mother died giving birth to him, thus he hated Ren but at the same time felt an obligation to take care of Ren in honor of his late wife. He confronts Ren after finding out where he ran away to and, after Ren stands up to him, they come to an understanding.

Michael is Shinra's mentor in conducting.

Banshō is father of the Kuonji siblings and was a great philanthropist.

Media

Visual novel
The visual novel was produced by the company Minato Soft first released as an adult game on May 25, 2007 for the PC as a DVD. A version for the PlayStation 2 with adult-content removed, was produced by Minato Soft's sister company Minato Station and released on March 27, 2008 under the title .

Novels
There have been two novel adaptations based on the series. The first, written by Haruka Fuse, is published by Paradigm. The first novel was released on September 19, 2007, and two novels have been published as of November 20, 2007. A third volume will follow on January 25, 2008. The second novel series, written by Fūichirō Noyama, is published by GoodsTrain under their TwinTail Novels label. The first novel was released on September 25, 2007, and two novels will have been published as of December 25, 2007.

Manga
A manga adaptation written by Hamao Kō and illustrated by Sanbō Shironeko began serialization in Kadokawa Shoten's video game and manga magazine Comp Ace on October 26, 2007. The first tankōbon volume was released on March 26, 2008 and contained five chapters.

Anime
An anime adaptation directed by Susumu Kudo (who also developed the story for the original game), written by Takahiro, and produced by animation studio A.C.G.T aired in Japan between January 6 and March 29, 2008 on TV Kanagawa, containing thirteen episodes.

Episodes

Audio CDs
A set of three drama CDs have been released based on the series. The first was released on August 24, 2007, and the second was released on October 26, 2007; the third followed on December 28, 2007. A radio drama CD was released on November 30, 2007.

References

External links
 Visual novel official website 
 PS2 version official website 
 Anime official website 
 
 

2007 Japanese novels
2007 video games
2008 Japanese television series debuts
2008 Japanese television series endings
Anime series
Bishōjo games
Comedy anime and manga
Eroge
Harem anime and manga
Harem video games
Japan-exclusive video games
Romance video games
Seinen manga
Video games developed in Japan
Video games set in Yokohama
Visual novels
Windows games